The Aisin AW AF33 is a 5-speed automatic transaxle developed and manufactured in Anjo, Japan by Aisin AW, a division of Aisin. It is designed to be used in transverse engine configurations in both FWD and AWD configurations.

The actual model codes are AW55-50SN and AW55-51SN. Manufactures have sometimes chosen own designations such as AF23, AF33 or AF33-5 (GM), RE5F22A (Nissan and Infiniti) or SU1 (Renault). Other manufacturers use the original designation(s) or minor variations of it such as AW55-50 LE (Volvo), AW 55-51 LE  (Opel) and FA57 (Saab).

Maintenance
Several manufacturers list the transmission in their owners manuals as fill for life, meaning that there are no scheduled transmission fluid changes under normal operating conditions.

Transmission experts recommend regular fluid changes for severe driving condition, every . Specific fluid must be used. If incorrect fluid is used it could result in improper operation and lead to transmission damage.

Aisin recommends to follow the scheduled maintenance. A badly done oil change can destroy the transmission.

Reliability 
Some AF33 transmissions – specifically the variants used in Volvo vehicles – were very unreliable, with failures occurring within  on some vehicles. Volvo eventually released an upgrade package to address the issue.

Fluid
Fluid must meet the JWS 3309 specification. The fluid can be found under varying designations.

GM Saturn: Aisin AF23/33-5 type T-IV P/N 88900925
(in Canada, P/N 22689186).
Volvo AW55-50/51SN P/N 1161540-8.
Nissan RE5F22A Nissan Matic "K"
Fluid capacity 8.2 qt. (7.8L) Synthetic.

Exxon/Mobil manufactures a specific synthetic mineral fluid for this transmission simply called "3309".

Applications
Ford Motor Company
 Ford
 2008–2012 Ford Kuga 2.5T AWD

General Motors

 Chevrolet
 2004–2009 Chevrolet Equinox (GM code M09 (FWD), M45 (AWD))
 2006–2010 Chevrolet Captiva
 2006-2007 Chevrolet Epica

 Opel / Vauxhall
 2002–2004 Opel Vectra C
 2002–2004 Opel Signum
 2006–2015 Opel Antara

 Pontiac
 2006–2009 Pontiac Torrent

 Saab
 2003–2007 Saab 9-3
 2002–2009 Saab 9-5

 Saturn
 2002–2003 Saturn Vue
 2003–2004 Saturn Ion (GM code M43)

Lancia
 2002–2008 Lancia Thesis

Nissan
 2004–2006 Nissan Maxima (code RE5F22A)
 2004–2006 Nissan Quest
 2004–2006 Nissan Altima

Renault
 2001–2007 Renault Laguna (code SU1)
 2003–2015 Renault Espace
 2002–2009 Renault Vel Satis

Suzuki
 2007–2008 Suzuki XL7

Volvo
 2000 Volvo S70 (FWD)
 2000 Volvo V70 (FWD & AWD)
 2000–2004 Volvo C70 (FWD)
 2000–2004 Volvo S40 (FWD)
 2000–2004 Volvo V40 (FWD)
 2000–2009 Volvo S60 (FWD & AWD)
 2000–2005 Volvo V70 II (FWD & AWD)
 2003–2007 Volvo XC70 (AWD)
 2000–2006 Volvo S80 (FWD & AWD)
 2003–2006 Volvo XC90 (FWD & AWD)
 2004–2013 Volvo S40 II (FWD & AWD)
 2004–2013 Volvo V50 (FWD & AWD)
 2006–2013 Volvo C30 (FWD)
 2006–2013 Volvo C70 II (FWD)

See also
List of Aisin transmissions

Notes

References

AF33